Araguatins is a municipality located in the Brazilian state of Tocantins. Its population was 36,170 (2020) and its area is 2,625 km².

References

Municipalities in Tocantins